Scopula ancellata, the angled wave moth or pointed-winged wave, is a moth of the family Geometridae. It was described by George Duryea Hulst in 1887. It is found in North America from Quebec west to the Northwest Territories and British Columbia and south to Michigan, Indiana and Arizona. The habitat consists of mixed wood and coniferous forests.

Adults are light tan with well-defined dark crosslines and discal spots.

The larvae feed on Meliotus alba and Alnus tenuifolia.

Subspecies
Scopula ancellata ancellata
Scopula ancellata catenes (Druce, 1892)

References

Moths described in 1887
ancellata
Moths of North America